Vitrea pseudotrolli is a species of small, air-breathing land snail, a terrestrial pulmonate gastropod mollusk in the family Pristilomatidae.

Distribution 
This species is found in France and Italy.

References 

Pristilomatidae
Gastropods described in 1983
Taxonomy articles created by Polbot